The Ames Range is an Antarctic range of snow-covered, flat-topped, steep-sided mountains, extending in a N-S direction for 32 km (20 mi) and forming a right angle with the eastern end of the Flood Range in Marie Byrd Land.

They were discovered by the United States Antarctic Service Expedition (1939–41) and named by Richard E. Byrd for his father-in-law, Joseph Ames.

The Ames Range consists of three coalescing shield volcanoes: Mount Andrus, Mount Kosciusko and Mount Kauffman, and Mount Boennighausen.

Other Features 
There are several glaciers draining from the Ames Range:
 Coleman Glacier
 Jacoby Glacier
 Rosenberg Glacier

Other features include:
 Brown Valley
 Gardiner Ridge, connecting Mt. Kosciusko to Mt. Kauffman
Lind Ridge
 Forrest Pass, which separates the Ames Range from the Flood Range

Sources

Notes

 
Volcanoes of Marie Byrd Land
Polygenetic shield volcanoes
Miocene shield volcanoes